The Billboard Latin Pop Airplay is a subchart of the Latin Airplay chart that ranks the most-played Latin pop songs on Latin radio stations.  Published by Billboard magazine, the data are compiled by Nielsen SoundScan based collectively on each single's weekly airplay.

Chart history

References

United States Latin Pop
2022
2022 in Latin music